Port Henry station is an Amtrak intercity train station in Port Henry, New York served by the Adirondack. The station has one low-level side platform on the west side of the track.

The station building, designed by architects Fuller & Wheeler, was built in 1888 by the Delaware and Hudson Railroad. It was listed on the National Register of Historic Places on June 1, 1995 as the Delaware & Hudson Railroad Depot. The station building currently serves as a local senior citizen's and community center. A Canadian Pacific Alco ore car and a Lake Champlain and Moriah Railroad caboose are on display near the station.

See also
National Register of Historic Places listings in Essex County, New York

References

External links

Amtrak stations in New York (state)
Former Delaware and Hudson Railway stations
Railway stations in the United States opened in 1888
Railway stations on the National Register of Historic Places in New York (state)
National Register of Historic Places in Essex County, New York
Transportation buildings and structures in Essex County, New York